The Sony E 10-18mm F4 OSS is a constant maximum aperture ultra-wide angle zoom lens for the Sony E-mount announced by Sony on September 12, 2012, and released January 2013.

Build quality
The lens showcases a minimalist black exterior made of plastic. The barrel of the lens telescopes outward from the main lens body as it is zoomed in from 10mm to 18mm.

See also
List of Sony E-mount lenses

References

Camera lenses introduced in 2012
10-18